Selitë may refer to:

Selitë, Elbasan, a village in the municipality of Cërrik, Elbasan County, Albania
Selitë, Fier, a village in the municipality of Mallakastër, Fier County, Albania
Selitë, Kurbin, a village in the municipality of Kurbin, Lezhë County, Albania
Selitë, Mirditë, a village in the municipality of Mirditë, Lezhë County, Albania
Selitë, Tirana, a village in the municipality of Tirana, Tirana County, Albania
Selitë Mali, a village in the municipality of Tirana, Tirana County, Albania
Selita (tribe), a tribe in northern Albania